St. Xavier's College is a private Catholic university college located in the town of Mapusa (also spelt as Mapuca, Mapusa or Mapsa) in the district of North Goa, India. It is the largest and oldest college north of the Mandovi River in Goa, a state along the west coast of India. The college is accredited by the NAAC with a Grade "A", or CGPA 3.12 out of 4.

Background

The college was among the first set up, in 1963, soon after the end of Portuguese rule in Goa (in 1961). It was set up by a team of two Jesuit priests from Bombay (now Mumbai), and is currently administered by the Archdiocese of Goa.

Courses offered

Undergraduate
BSc – Biotechnology
BSc – Computer Science 
BSc – Electronics
BSc – Microbiology
B.A. – Journalism
Bachelor of Computer Applications
Bachelor of Business Administrations
B.A. – Mass Communication & Videography
BSc – Botany, Chemistry, Mathematics, Physics
Bachelor of Business Administrations (Travel & Tourism) 
B.Com. – Accounting, Cost Management Accounting, Business Management, & Banking
B.A. – Psychology / English / Hindi / Konkani / Marathi (6 units in each)
B.A. – Economics / History / Sociology / Philosophy (3 units in each)

Postgraduate
M.A. – Clinical Psychology, Human Resource Management, Counseling Psychology
M.Com. – Accounting and Finance, Business Management
MSc – Physical Chemistry

See also

 Dnyanprassarak Mandal’s College, Assagao, Goa
 List of Jesuit universities and colleges

References
  

Catholic universities and colleges in India
Universities and colleges in Goa
Buildings and structures in Mapusa
Educational institutions established in 1963
1963 establishments in Goa, Daman and Diu
Education in North Goa district